A mid-life update, particularly in the context of defence, is maintenance or renovation designed to extend the usefulness and capability of an item.

See also
 F-16 mid-life update

References 

Product management